Will Packham (born 13 January 1981) is an English former footballer who played in the Football League for Brighton & Hove Albion. After leaving Brighton in July 2003 Packham went on to play for a number of non-league teams.

References

English footballers
English Football League players
1981 births
Living people
Brighton & Hove Albion F.C. players
Farnborough F.C. players
Worthing F.C. players
Bognor Regis Town F.C. players
Fisher Athletic F.C. players
Association football goalkeepers